Lincoln Durham is an American alternative rock, southern gothic, revival punk, psycho blues, Americana singer, songwriter and one-man-band musician.

History 
Lincoln Durham was born in Whitney, Texas and grew up in Itasca, Texas. Durham started out playing fiddle when he was four. He competed in fiddle contests in Texas, Arkansas, and Oklahoma, and when he was ten, he won the Texas State Youth Fiddle Championship. In high school, Durham switched to electric guitar citing Nirvana as the inspiration for a new direction.  After high school he took a break from music, but he returned, switching over to acoustic guitar and picking up a slide guitar style. Durham was mentored by Ray Wylie Hubbard. Durham's current sound has been compared to Nick Cave, Jack White and Tom Waits.

Recordings 

In 2010, Durham recorded an extended play album, EP, produced by Ray Wylie Hubbard and George Reiff. The EP was released on May 11, 2010, as a sneak-peek for his upcoming debut album, which was in the process of being produced, but would not be released until almost two years later.

Lincoln Durham's debut full-length album, The Shovel vs. the Howling Bones was released January 31, 2012 by Rayburn Publishing.  The album was produced by Ray Wylie Hubbard and George Reiff at George Reiff's studio, The Finishing School in Austin, Texas. Durham played the majority of the instruments, including a 1929 Gibson HG22 guitar, a bird feeder, a hacksaw, and oil pans.  Drums were performed by Rick Richards.  Other guest musicians from Austin on the album were Derek O'Brien (guitar), Jeff Plankenhorn (mandolin), Bucca Allen (accordion and piano), and Idgy Vaughn (backup vocals on "Trucker's Love Song"), plus Lincoln Durham's wife, Alissa (backup vocals).

Durham's second album, Exodus of the Deemed Unrighteous was released on October 22, 2013, by Droog Records. The album was produced by George Reiff at his studio, The Finishing School in Austin, Texas, and has Rick Richards on drums again.

Durham's third album, Revelations of a Mind Unraveling, was released on March 25, 2016, on Droog Records. The album was produced by George Reiff at The Finishing School in Austin, Texas.

Durham's fourth album, And Into Heaven Came the Night, was released on March 30, 2018, on Droog Records. The album was produced by Lincoln Durham, and recorded at The Ice Cream Factory Studios and The Crypt in Austin, Texas.

Discography

Studio albums

Extended Play

EP extended play listing

References

External links
 
 
 

Living people
American blues guitarists
American male guitarists
American blues singers
American blues singer-songwriters
Singer-songwriters from Texas
Guitarists from Texas
People from Whitney, Texas
People from Itasca, Texas
Year of birth missing (living people)
American male singer-songwriters